Boondall is a suburb in the City of Brisbane, Queensland, Australia.

It was formerly known as Cabbage Tree Creek (after the creek that flows through the area).

Geography
Bounded on the north by Deagon, Sandgate and Shorncliffe, on the east by Nudgee and Nudgee Beach, on the south by Banyo, Geebung and Virginia and on the west by Taigum and Zillmere.

The borders of Boondall are defined by loosely following the Cabbage Tree Creek (Tighgum) to the north and then following down Muller Road in the west. When Muller Road intersects with Zillmere Road, it forms a corner near Zillmere Water Holes in the south and follow the creek to its connection with Nundah Creek and use Nundah Creek as a border back up to the Cabbage Tree Creek estuary completing the border.

The Boondall Wetlands are located in the east of the suburb. These internationally significant wetlands contain more than 1000 hectares of protected area that provide habitat to a wide range of animals including more than 190 species of birds.

A residential zone, Boondall is home to a mix of young and established families and retirees.

History

The name of Boondall is derived from an Aboriginal word meaning either crooked creek or cunjevoi (Alocasia macrorrhiza). The Turrbal people of north Brisbane were the original owners of the country around the Boondall Wetlands.

St Joseph's Nudgee College was established in January 1891 by the Christian Brothers, a Roman Catholic order. The site for the college was chosen by Ambrose Treacy after the Archbishop of Brisbane Robert Dunne asked that the Brothers establish a boarding school for Catholic boys from rural areas.

In January 1916, the Zillmere congregation of the Church of Christ commenced outreach in the Nudgee College area, erecting a bush shelter. On 23 December 1916, a chapel was built in a day by volunteers. In 1957, a new church building was erected and the old church building was used as a hall.

Boondall State School opened on 6 April 1925.

St Matthew's Anglican church at 178 Lyndhurst Road was dedicated on 21 September 1974 by Archbishop Arnott. It closed circa 1988. The property was purchased by Turbert Bhagwan Ram Dutta and his mother Gayatri Dutta with a view to using it as a Hindu temple. The local Hindu community supported the plan and the Hindu Society of Queensland was incorporated on 22 January 1992 and took over the ownership of the property.  The Gayatri Mandir was officially opened and blessed on Sunday 26 January 1992.

In 1975, Boondall Methodist Church was at 2218 Sandgate Road (approx ), becoming Boondall Uniting Church after the amalgamation of the Methodist Church into the Uniting Church in Australia in 1977. In June 1990 the Uniting Church in Australia congregations of Boondall, Brighton, Sandgate and Shorncliffe decided to amalgamate. Their new Sandgate Uniting Church in Deagon was opened in Sunday 20 November 1994.

Aboriginal and Torres Strait Islander people made up 2.5% of the population. The median age of the Boondall population was 37 years of age, 1 year below the Australian median. 68.7% of people living in Boondall were born in Australia, compared to the national average of 66.7%; the next most common countries of birth were New Zealand 5.3%, India 4.1%, England 2.2%, Philippines 2.1% and Fiji 1.3%. 77.0% of people only spoke English at home. Other languages spoken at home included Punjabi 2.7%, Hindi 1.2%, Mandarin 1.2%, Cantonese 1.1% and Italian 1.1%. The most common responses for religion were Catholic 30.3%, No Religion 25.4% and Anglican 11.6%.

Heritage listings
Boondall has a number of heritage-listed sites, including:

 23 Carlyle Road: Church of Christ Hall (also known as Boondall Church of Christ)
 11 Peacock Street: Railway footbridge (also known as the former Boondall Station pedestrian footbridge)
 2199 Sandgate Road: St Joseph's Nudgee College
2210 Sandgate Road: Boondall State School's Arbor Day trees
Adjacent Sandgate Road: Cabbage Tree Creek railway bridge

Education
 Boondall State School is a government primary (Prep-6) school for boys and girls on the corner of Sandgate Road and Roscommon Road. In 2018, the school had an enrolment of 681 students with 48 teachers (43 full-time equivalent) and 38 non-teaching staff (22 full-time equivalent). It includes a special education program. The school has received numerous awards for their educational programs (e.g. ELF Literacy Program).

St Joseph's Nudgee College is a Catholic primary and secondary (5–12) school for boys at 2199 Sandgate Road. The school is in the southern part of the suburb and was formerly within the suburb boundaries of neighbouring Nudgee. In 2018, the school had an enrolment of 1586 students with 130 teachers (128 full-time equivalent) and 115 non-teaching staff (91 full-time equivalent). The school has produced seven Rhodes scholars.

Amenities

Close to the Boondall railway station is the Brisbane Entertainment Centre, where many live entertainment shows are held.  One of the shows at the Brisbane Entertainment Centre was the popular musical theatre production The Man from Snowy River: Arena Spectacular.

The suburb is also home to the Ice World Boondall, where the Brisbane Blue Tongues of the AIHL used to play before relocating to Bundall Iceland on the Gold Coast.

There are a number of parks in the suburb, including:

 Barlow Place Park
 Boondall Park
 Boondall Wetlands
 Boondall Wetlands Western Extension
 Donna Philp Park
 Eton Avenue Park
 Frank Sleeman Park
 Gildor Street Park
 Jalomy Street Park
 Keppel Street Park
 Laar Crescent Park
 Lambert Mcbride Park
 Mulbeam Park
 Northumbria Road Park
 Roghan Road Park (no.2260)
 Wahl Street Park

References

External links

University of Queensland: Queensland Places: Boondall
 
 

 
Suburbs of the City of Brisbane